John Peter Jukes (7 August 1923 – 21 November 2011) was a British prelate of the Catholic Church. He was a member of the Conventual Franciscans.

Jukes was born in Eltham, ordained a priest on 19 July 1952. He was named Auxiliary Bishop of Southwark as well as Titular Bishop of Strathearn on 20 December 1979, and ordained on 30 January 1980. He had particular oversight of the Kent pastoral area. He retired on 11 December 1998. He died on 21 November 2011, aged 88.

See also
Archdiocese of Southwark

References

External links
Catholic-Hierarchy
Roman Catholic Archdiocese of Southwark website

20th-century Roman Catholic bishops in England
Place of death missing
People from Eltham
1923 births
2011 deaths
Conventual Friars Minor